Smithfield is a village located in the parish of Kirklinton Middle approximately 8 miles north of Carlisle in Cumbria, United Kingdom, and has a population of around 250. The main road through the village, the A6071, leads to the nearby market towns of Longtown (west, 4 miles) and Brampton (east, 6 miles).

Smithfield can be described as a commuter village with the vast majority of the adult population working in Carlisle. With infrequent public transport (Stagecoach) to Carlisle, most journeys are made by car.

References

External links

Villages in Cumbria
City of Carlisle